Tuahiwi is a small New Zealand settlement located between Woodend and Rangiora.

The settlement includes Tuahiwi Marae, a marae (tribal meeting ground) of Ngāi Tahu and its Te Ngāi o Tūāhuriri Rūnanga branch. The marae includes the Māhunui II wharenui (meeting house).

History

Pre-European
The land on which Tuahiwi was founded was originally a Ngāi Tūahuriri hapū of Ngāi Tahu pā site. With European settlement, the site was reserved for Māori in 1848 by Walter Mantell following the signing of Kemp's Deed. In 1831, prior to European settlement, the pa had been attacked by Te Rauparaha. The attack was a revenge raid (utu) and the pa returned to the Ngāi Tūahuriri when the attackers left.

Development
There was a meeting house on the site in 1870 that almost burnt down. Significant developments included the establishment of a Māori mission which included a church built in 1867 with its foundation stone having been laid by Governor George Grey on his visit to the settlement.

In 1890 Tuahiwi was described as having a neat village of Maori residences. The old whares had been replaced by more substantial fenced cottages with gardens. A school, church (St Stephens), and meeting hall were in the centre of the township and there was a flagpole in front of the meeting hall. The Maori Land Court used the hall from time to time.

Events
In 1900 the Tuahiwi hall was used as a base by D Company of the 1st North Canterbury Mounted Rifle Battalion, a volunteer unit. The Mounted Rifles included Tuahiwi Maori who on being refused permission to fight in the Second Boer War protested to the Premier Richard Seddon in 1901.

Dr Reginald Koettlitz and a number of members of Scott's Discovery Expedition made a goodwill visit to Tuahiwi in December 1901 prior to the expedition's departure from Lyttelton for Antarctica.

Te Wai Pounamu College for Māori girls was founded there in 1909. It relocated to Christchurch.

Demographics 

Tuahiwi had a population of 945 at the 2018 New Zealand census, a decrease of 18 people (-1.9%) since the 2013 census, and an increase of 87 people (10.1%) since the 2006 census. There were 318 households. There were 483 males and 462 females, giving a sex ratio of 1.05 males per female. The median age was 44.2 years (compared with 37.4 years nationally), with 156 people (16.5%) aged under 15 years, 189 (20.0%) aged 15 to 29, 465 (49.2%) aged 30 to 64, and 132 (14.0%) aged 65 or older.

Ethnicities were 85.7% European/Pākehā, 23.2% Māori, 1.9% Pacific peoples, 1.9% Asian, and 1.9% other ethnicities (totals add to more than 100% since people could identify with multiple ethnicities).

The proportion of people born overseas was 14.0%, compared with 27.1% nationally.

Although some people objected to giving their religion, 58.7% had no religion, 29.2% were Christian, 0.6% were Muslim and 4.1% had other religions.

Of those at least 15 years old, 105 (13.3%) people had a bachelor or higher degree, and 150 (19.0%) people had no formal qualifications. The median income was $32,100, compared with $31,800 nationally. The employment status of those at least 15 was that 432 (54.8%) people were employed full-time, 123 (15.6%) were part-time, and 24 (3.0%) were unemployed.

Education

Tuahiwi School is a full primary state school, covering years 1 to 8, with  students (as of  The school is bilingual, offering students a choice of tuition in Māori-language or English education.

Notable people
Aroha Reriti-Crofts - Community worker
Erihana Ryan - Māori psychiatrist
Wiremu Nahira Te-hoika - a Māori chief born about 1812 at Kaiapoi who moved to Tuahiwi in 1850, where he died in February 1903

References

Waimakariri District
Populated places in Canterbury, New Zealand